Lepturgotrichona is a genus of beetles in the family Cerambycidae, containing the following species:

 Lepturgotrichona bordoni Monné & Martins, 1976
 Lepturgotrichona cubaecola (Fisher, 1942)
 Lepturgotrichona stigmatica (Bates, 1881)

References

Acanthocinini